Fairwarp is a small village within the civil parish of Maresfield in the Wealden district of East Sussex, England.

Reginald John Campbell, British Congregationalist and Anglican divine, died at his home in the village in 1956.

The actors Joan Tetzel and Oscar Homolka are buried together at Christ Church.

References

External links

 History – Fairwarp Community Society

Villages in East Sussex
Maresfield